Kor Para is a village situated in the Singer Kach area of Daulatpur Union, Bishwanath Upazila, Sylhet District, Bangladesh. Kor Para village boasts some really respectable individuals which include 4 brothers Master Idris Ali, Master Modoris Ali, Master Abdul Mannan, Master Husson Nur and Master Abdullah. The latter being the son of Master Idris Ali and nephew of the four uncles mentioned also.

References

Villages in Sylhet District
Bishwanath Upazila